Series 22 of Top Gear, a British motoring magazine and factual television programme, was broadcast in the United Kingdom on BBC Two during 2015, consisting of eight episodes - seven of these were aired between 25 January and 8 March, while the eighth was aired on 28 June following a disruption in production; two additional episodes were planned but never produced. The series was preceded by a two-part special focused on the presenters conducting a road trip across Argentina, titled Top Gear: Patagonia Special, and aired during 2014 on 27–28 December. This series' highlights included the presenters conducting a race across St. Petersburg, creating home-made ambulances, a recreation of a famous Land Rover Defender advert, and a road trip across Australia in GT cars. 

This series was the final to feature Jeremy Clarkson, Richard Hammond and James May as the programme's presenters, and Andy Wilman as its executive producer, after an incident during production of the twenty-second series, involving accusations of physical and verbal abuse, led to the BBC dismissing Clarkson from the programme, which subsequently led to the others to resign in April 2015. The BBC's investigation into the accusations brought an abrupt hiatus to the programme after the seventh episode, with Hammond, May and Wilman agreeing to produce one final episode featuring two films that had been completed before production was disrupted. The two-part special that had preceded this series also drew international attention when the presenters faced problems completing filming and facing threats to their lives by residents of the Patagonia region over claims a car they drove had number plates deliberately referencing the Falklands War. 

To mark the end of the trio's era of presenting Top Gear, the BBC produced a two-part compilation special, titled Top Gear: From A-Z, which aired on 26–30 December 2015, and was narrated by comedian John Bishop. The special featured the best moments of the past twenty-two series of the programme, and included comments by a number of celebrities and sporting personalities about the presenters' work.

Production
News that production of the series was being planned was hinted by Clarkson on Twitter on 29 April 2014, before he later confirmed on 7 July that year that he was going to Morocco to start filming for the show, with a media outlet in Australia further revealing on 24 October and 29 October that the trio were filming within the country's Northern Territory.

While Wilman had stated in the January 2015 issue of Top Gear Magazine (issue #265) that Series 22 was to contain 10 episodes in its broadcast, only seven were actually aired; the series abruptly ended after the seventh episode in the wake of Clarkson's suspension, with the BBC opting to pull the last three episodes from its schedule until its investigations on the presenter's assault was completed. Following their decision not to renew Clarkson's contract, the Director General Tony Hall announced that the broadcaster intended to show the three pulled episodes after it had debated on how to do so, although all that was left for use was two filmed vehicle challenges. Furthermore, Hammond and May, along with Wilman, had announced their decisions not to return to the show, leading to a re-think on the matter. After debating how to end the series, the BBC decided to air the two completed films as part of an extended special episode, with Hammond, May and Wilman asked to postpone their departures from the show to help with producing and hosting it; the official website of Top Gear hinted on 8 June 2015 at this having happened by announcing that the filmed segments were to be shown later that year; it was not until a week later, on 15 June, that the BBC officially confirmed that the segments had been allocated to a 75-minute special that was under production. Production of the episode led to studio segments being filmed, though no audience was invited to be at the show's studio at Dunsfold on the day of filming. The final episode of the series was eventually scheduled and aired on 28 June.

Episodes

Criticism and controversy

Filming of Patagonia Special
During 2014, in September and October, filming of the Top Gear special in Argentina was being done by the presenters, Jeremy Clarkson, Richard Hammond, and James May, alongside a crew of 29 people, with the group using three cars for a road trip across the country and its neighbour of Chile. However, controversy arose when an incident occurred during filming, which received extensive coverage by the media in both Britain and Argentina. Whilst the crew and presenters were travelling south to Ushuaia, comments emerged on Twitter which alleged that the number plate "H982 FKL" on the Porsche 928 GT being driven by Clarkson, was a direct reference to the 1982 Falklands War. Upon the comments being seen by one of the film crew, the number plate was substituted with one that read "H1 VAE". However, when the group arrived in Ushuaia in Tierra del Fuego on 2 October, in which they had planned to film in the city for three more days before continuing to Chile, a large protest had formed, consisting of Argentinian veterans of the Falklands War who claimed the group were deliberately referencing the war, despite the change of number plate, forcing the crew and presenters to stay at a hotel while discussions commenced between the producers and representatives of the protesters to calm the tension down. Andy Wilman, executive producer for the show, said on 2 October that "Top Gear production purchased three cars for a forthcoming programme; to suggest that this car was either chosen for its number plate, or that an alternative number plate was substituted for the original is completely untrue." On the same day, Clarkson tweeted "For once, we did nothing wrong." "H982 FKL" has been registered to the Porsche since its manufacture in May 1991. Clarkson later wrote for The Sunday Times that he "had to hide under a bed" due to "a mob howling for his blood". 

However, discussions failed to do anything, and with more protesters arriving and the atmosphere turning hostile, local police told the group they could not and would not give them any assistance, leading to the team making the decision of leaving. Believing the presenters were the main target of the controversy, Clarkson, Hammond and May left for Buenos Aires alongside the women of the crew, while the rest of the team focused on driving their equipment and the cars, both the presenters' and their own, back to the border with Chile; in a statement made by May after the incident, planning was done for possible airlifts for the crew if the journey to the border had become too dangerous, in which he and his fellow presenters assisted in planning prior to flying back to Britain. The film crew, driving back to the border in convoy, faced three major problems in their attempt to leave; all of these were shown as part of the Patagonia Special. The first came when they found the road they had taken to arrive in Rio Grande a day earlier, was now closed to them by crowds of people, forcing them to drive on tertiary roads. The second came when an intimidating crowd stopped them deliberately in Tolhuin, before pelting their cars with eggs, rocks and other missiles before they could escape, resulting in two of the film crew being injured and their cars receiving minor damage. In light of the attack and believing they were a magnet for trouble, the team abandoned the presenters' cars and continued on through the night for the border; pictures show that the abandoned cars had been attacked and damaged with stones. Their third problem came when, at 2am that night, they had to find a tractor to help get the camera cars across the river and into Chile.

Following the incident, the Argentine ambassador Alicia Castro met with BBC Director of Television Danny Cohen on 31 October 2014, and demanded a formal apology for what occurred. However, the BBC refused to do so, making it clear that they intended to broadcast the special as a fair representation of the events that occurred. On 28 May 2015, the BBC Trust, after investigating claims that there was a "cover-up" going on involving the use of the number plate, ruled that this was not the case and that no evidence had been provided to show that the reference to the Falklands War had been deliberate, adding it would not take further action on the matter. On 29 October, later that year, The Guardian reported that an appeal made at the appeal courts in Argentina had successfully demanded that Judge Maria Cristina Barrionuevo was to re-open a criminal investigation she had presided over, after she had decided not to press ahead with a full-scale investigation into the crew's decision to change the Porsche's number plate. Her decision to do so was because she had felt that it had been forced to happen by "massive government and popular pressure", despite the fact that it is an offence in the country to change a vehicle's registered licence plate to another.

Clarkson's suspension and dismissal
In March 2015, the BBC announced that it had suspended Jeremy Clarkson while it would look into an incident that had occurred during filming in Hawes, North Yorkshire, with the remaining episodes of the series withdrawn while they dealt with their investigations. Former Stig, Perry McCarthy, criticised the decision by the broadcaster to pull the episodes from the schedule. Media coverage of the matter soon revealed that Clarkson had physically and verbally abused a producer, Oisin Tymon, after being offered soup and a cold meal platter instead of the steak he wanted, and learning that the chef at the hotel they were staying at had gone home. Despite a petition starting on Change.org on 10 March by blogger Guido Fawkes, aimed at reversing the decision on Clarkson being suspended, and being delivered on the afternoon of 20 March to the BBC after receiving one million signatures, which made it the fastest-growing campaign in Change.org's history, the broadcaster officially announced on 25 March that after deliberations on Clarkson's action and behaviour, it had decided to not renew his contract, effectively axing him from the show. 

On 24 February 2016, Clarkson formally apologised to Tymon, while settling a claim made by the producer for racial discrimination and physical injury sustained in the incident.

Due to Clarkson's dismissal, the series was shortened by two episodes. The planned eighth episode would have featured Gary Lineker as the Star in a Reasonably Priced Car, while Henry Cavill would have been the guest in episode nine. Episode nine would have also featured an additional film featuring Clarkson testing a trio of luxury limousines on and off the track. The planned tenth and final episode would have been a special in which the three presenters take an epic road trip across "one of the most remote areas of the planet".

References

2014 British television seasons
2015 British television seasons
Top Gear seasons